Matherne is a French surname. Notable people with the surname include: 

 Beverly Matherne (born 1946), American writer and poet
 Wayne Matherne (born 1949), retired Canadian football player
 Brian Matherne, a coach in a sex abuse case in the archdiocese of Gregory Michael Aymond
 Ethel Jeanne Matherne (1916–2002), wife of educator and businessman Cliff Ammons
 Londa Jean Matherne, wife of Harry Connick Sr.